or Yuuko is a common feminine Japanese given name.

Possible writings
Yūko can be written using different kanji characters and can mean:
優子, "gentle, child"
裕子, "abundance, child"
祐子, "helpful, child"
夕子, "evening, child"
有子, "qualified, child"
悠子, "permanence, child"
侑子, "leading, child"
結子, "bind, child"
由子, "reason, child"
勇子, "courage, child"
友子, "friend, child"
木綿子, "cotton, child"
The given name can also be written in hiragana or katakana.

People

, Japanese TV presenter and news anchor
, Japanese singer-songwriter
, Japanese bikini model
, Japanese marathon runner
, Japanese singer and actress
, Japanese actress who is most popular in South Korea, known as Yoo Min
, (born 1975) Japanese voice actress
, plays the keyboards for Southern All Stars
, Japanese voice actress
, Japanese classical violinist
, Japanese fashion model and actress
, Japanese voice actress 
, Japanese pair skater
, Japanese voice actress 
, Japanese volleyball player
, Japanese voice actress
, Japanese voice actress, actress, J-pop singer and sound director
, Japanese television personality and actress
, Japanese voice actress
, Japanese actress
, Japanese golfer
, Japanese politician
, Japanese actress
, Japanese butterfly swimmer
, J-pop singer and actress
, Japanese idol and model
, AKB48 member
, Japanese volleyball player
, Japanese cricketer
, Japanese racewalker
, Japanese politician
, Japanese voice actress
 a Japanese voice actress
, Japanese designer, creator of Hello Kitty
, Japanese actress and gravure idol
, Japanese illustrator
, Japanese volleyball player
, Japanese triathlete
, Japanese actress
, Japanese actress
, Granddaughter of General Hideki Tōjō
, Japanese character designer and illustrator
, Japanese straight hair specialist
, Japanese actress

Fictional characters
 Yuko, a female elf from Mia and Me, a children's TV series
Yuko, an antagonist character in Sexy Parodius
Yuko, a female character from Sword Art Online
Yūko, a female character and the yūrei in The Terror: Infamy
Yuuko Aioi, a main character from the anime and manga series Nichijou
Yuko Amamiya, the heroine of game Ef: A Fairy Tale of the Two
 Yuko Amasawa, one of the main characters in the series Dennō Coil
Yuko Asou, the main character in the Valis series
Yuko Ichihara - Witch of dimensions, a character from the manga and anime xxxHolic and Tsubasa: Reservoir Chronicle by CLAMP
 Yūko Kanoe, a character from the manga and anime Dusk Maiden of Amnesia
 Yuko Minami, Ultraman Ace's alter ego alongside Seiji Hokuto in the 1972 namesake tokusatsu film
 Yuko Ogawa, a character from the manga and anime Kocchi Muite! Miiko
Yuko Okonogi, one of the main characters in the series Dennō Coil
Yuko Omori, a character from the anime HappinessCharge PreCure!
Yuko Sakaki, a character in the novel Battle Royale, and the film and manga of the same name
 Yuuko Shirakawa, a librarian from the visual novel Katawa Shoujo
Yuko Takao, a character in Shin Megami Tensei III: Nocturne
Yuuko Yoshikawa, a character from the novel and anime Hibike! Euphonium
Yuuko Nishi a character from the manga and anime A Channel (manga)

See also
5291 Yuuko, a main-belt asteroid
"Yuko and Hiro", a song by Blur

Japanese feminine given names